Billington and Langho is a civil parish in Ribble Valley, Lancashire, England.  It contains nine listed buildings that are recorded in the National Heritage List for England.  Of these, two are listed at Grade I, the highest of the three grades, one is at Grade II*, the middle grade, and the others are at Grade II, the lowest grade.  The parish contains the villages of Billington and Langho, and is otherwise mainly rural.  The listed buildings are houses, farmhouses, a farm building, and a church.

Key

Buildings

References

Citations

Sources

Lists of listed buildings in Lancashire
Buildings and structures in Ribble Valley